Kisko is a village in the Kisko CD block in the Lohardaga Sadar subdivision of the Lohardaga district in the Indian state of Jharkhand.

Geography

Location
Kisko is located at

Area overview
The map alongside shows an undulating plateau area with the hilly tract in the west and north-west. Three Bauxite mining centres are marked. It is an overwhelmingly rural district with 87.6% of the population living in the rural areas.

Note: The map alongside presents some of the notable locations in the district. All places marked in the map are linked in the larger full screen map.

Civic administration

Police station
There is a police station at Kisko.

CD block HQ
The headquarters of Kisko CD block are located at Kisko village.

Demographics
According to the 2011 Census of India, Kisko had a population of 2,278 (1,260 (55%) males and 1,018 (45%) females). Population in the age range 0–6 years was 351. The number of literate persons in Kisko was 1,632 (84.69% of the population over 6 years).
 
(*For language details see Kisko block#Language and religion)

Education
Kasturba Gandhi Balika Vidyalaya is a Hindi-medium girls only institution established in 2005. It has facilities for teaching from class VI to class XII. The school has a playground, a library with 2,500 books and has five computers for learning and teaching purposes.

Residential High School Kisko is a Hindi-medium boys only institution established in 1962. It has facilities for teaching from class I to class X. The school has a playground, a library with 3,722 books and has five computers for teaching and learning purposes.

S.S. High School Kisko is a Hindi-medium coeducational institution established in 1974. It has facilities for teaching in classes IX and X. The school has a playground and a library with 600 books.

Project Girls High School Kisko is a Hindi-medium girls only institution established in 1984. It has facilities for teaching from class VII to class X. The school has a playground and a library with 700 books.

References

Villages in Lohardaga district